Valdemar Kendzior (26 January 1926 – 13 October 1998) was a Danish amateur football (soccer) player of Polish descent, who played for Skovshoved IF in Denmark. He was the top goalscorer of the 1952 and 1953 Danish football championships. He played two games and scored three goals for the Denmark national football team.

References

External links
 Danish national team profile

1926 births
1998 deaths
Danish men's footballers
Denmark international footballers
Danish people of Polish descent
Skovshoved IF players
Association footballers not categorized by position